Piechocki is a Polish-language surname derived from the placename Piechoty. Notable people with this surname include:

Chris Piechocki (born 1979), Australian actor
Kacper Piechocki (born 1995), Polish volleyball player
Virgile Piechocki (born 1997), French footballer

See also
Piechota

References

Polish-language surnames